John Townsend (born May 23, 1938) is a Wisconsin politician and legislator.

Born in St. Louis, Missouri, Townsend graduated from Wayne State University. He served on the Fond du Lac, Wisconsin Common Council. Townsend was elected to the Wisconsin State Assembly in 1999. In October 2009, Townsend announced his retirement from politics, confirming that he would not seek re-election.

References

Politicians from St. Louis
Politicians from Fond du Lac, Wisconsin
Wayne State University alumni
Members of the Wisconsin State Assembly
Wisconsin city council members
1938 births
Living people
21st-century American politicians